His Majesty's Naval Service is the United Kingdom's naval warfare and maritime service. It consists of the Royal Navy, Royal Marines, Royal Fleet Auxiliary, Royal Naval Reserve, Royal Marines Reserve and Naval Careers Service. The term Naval Service should be distinguished from the "UK Naval Services", which consist of the Naval Service and the Merchant Navy. The Naval Service as a whole falls under the command of the Navy Board, which is headed by the First Sea Lord. This position is currently held by Admiral Sir Ben Key (appointed November 2021). The Defence Council delegates administration of the Naval Service to the Admiralty Board, chaired by the Secretary of State for Defence.

The Naval Service is dominated by the Royal Navy, and operates primarily from three bases in the United Kingdom where commissioned ships are based; Portsmouth, Clyde and Devonport, the last being the largest operational naval base in Western Europe. As of early 2023, there were about 180 vessels in service with the various branches of the Naval Service and supporting organisations, at that time including; 72 commissioned ships of the Royal Navy, 33 landing craft of the Royal Marines, 63 auxiliary vessels of Marine Services and 13 auxiliary ships of the Royal Fleet Auxiliary. As of March 2019, HM Naval Service employed a total of 40,600 personnel.

In 2020, the First Sea Lord announced that the 'Naval Service' will informally be known as the 'Royal Navy'. The Royal Navy was made a colloquial name for the Naval Service as part of a transformation programme with the approval of the Navy Executive Committee to reflect the strength of the Royal Navy brand and assist with unifying the force.

The total displacement of the Royal Navy and the Royal Fleet Auxiliary is, as of early 2023, in excess of 772,000 tonnes.

King's Regulations for the Royal Navy

Components as of 2017 
The 2017 Queen's Regulations for the Royal Navy stipulate that the Naval Service consists of:
 The Royal Navy (Royal Naval Reserve) - including Queen Alexandra's Royal Naval Nursing Service 
 The Royal Marines (Royal Marines Reserve)
 Naval Careers Service

The Royal Fleet Auxiliary operate a fleet of auxiliaries in support of the Royal Navy. Royal Fleet Auxiliary personnel are part of the Ministry of Defence civil service. Among the many contractors which support the Ministry of Defence and Royal Navy is Serco Marine Services, provided under a private finance initiative.

Former composition
The following services were formerly also components of the Naval Service:
 The Women's Royal Naval Service (merged into the Royal Navy in 1993)
 The Royal Naval Minewatching Service (reformed into the Royal Naval Auxiliary Service in 1962 and disbanded in 1994)
 The Queen Alexandra's Royal Naval Nursing Service (incorporated within the Royal Navy in 2000)

Naval Reserve Forces:
 The Royal Naval Volunteer Reserve (merged with the Royal Naval Reserve in 1958)
 The Royal Naval Volunteer (Supplementary) Reserve
 The Royal Naval Volunteer (Wireless) Reserve
 The Royal Naval Volunteer (Postal) Reserve)
 The Royal Naval Emergency Reserve (disbanded c. 1959)
 The Royal Naval Special Reserve (disbanded c. 1960)
 The Women's Royal Naval Volunteer Reserve (renamed the Women's Royal Naval Reserve in 1958, merged into the Royal Naval Reserve in 1993)
 The Women's Royal Naval Supplementary Reserve
 The Queen Alexandra's Royal Naval Nursing Service Reserve (incorporated within the Royal Naval Reserve in 2000)

Formerly the Royal Maritime Auxiliary Service, the Fleet Reserve, and the Royal Corps of Naval Constructors were also considered part of the Naval Service.

Composition of the Naval Service

Royal Navy

Referred to as the "Senior Service" by virtue of it being the oldest service within the British Armed Forces, the Royal Navy is a technologically sophisticated naval force and forms the core structure of the Naval Service. Command of deployable assets is exercised by the Fleet Commander. The United Kingdom's nuclear deterrent is carried aboard the navy's  of four nuclear ballistic-missile submarines. The surface fleet consists of aircraft carriers, destroyers, frigates, amphibious assault ships, patrol ships, mine-countermeasures, and miscellaneous vessels. The submarine service has existed within the Royal Navy for more than 100 years. The service possessed a combined fleet of diesel-electric and nuclear-powered submarines until the early 1990s. Following the Options for Change defence review, the Upholder-class diesel-electric submarines were withdrawn and the attack submarine flotilla is now exclusively nuclear-powered.

Royal Marines

The infantry component of the Naval Service is the Corps of Royal Marines. Consisting of a single manoeuvre brigade (3 Commando Brigade) and various independent units, the Royal Marines specialise in amphibious, arctic, and mountain warfare. Contained within 3 Commando Brigade are three attached army units; 1st Battalion, The Rifles, an infantry battalion based at Beachley Barracks near Chepstow (from April 2008), 29 Commando Regiment Royal Artillery, an artillery regiment based in Plymouth, and 24 Commando Regiment Royal Engineers.  The Commando Logistic Regiment consists of personnel from the Army, Royal Marines, and Royal Navy.

Naval Careers Service

The Naval Careers Service is the recruiting arm of the Naval Service.  It is manned by former Royal Navy and Royal Marine personnel who are typically based at Armed Forces Careers Offices.  It is the smallest component of the Naval Service, comprising fewer than 200 personnel.

In support of the Naval Service

Royal Fleet Auxiliary

The Royal Fleet Auxiliary is a civilian-manned fleet owned by the British Ministry of Defence. The RFA enables ships of the Royal Navy to maintain operations around the world.  Its primary role is to supply the Royal Navy with fuel, ammunition and supplies, normally by replenishment at sea (RAS). It also transports Army and Royal Marine personnel, as well as supporting training exercises. RFA personnel are members of the Ministry of Defence civil service who wear Merchant Navy rank insignia with naval uniforms and are under naval discipline when the vessel is engaged on warlike operations. RFA vessels are commanded and crewed by these civilians, augmented with regular and reserve Royal Navy personnel to perform specialised military functions such as operating and maintaining helicopters or providing hospital facilities. The RFA is funded out of the UK defence budget and the Commodore commanding the RFA is directly responsible to the Royal Navy Fleet Commander.

The Royal Fleet Auxiliary also augments the Royal Navy's amphibious warfare capabilities through its three  vessels. The service is manned by around 1,850 civilian personnel.

Marine Services

Marine Services enables Royal Navy and Royal Fleet Auxiliary Ships, including the United Kingdom's Strategic Nuclear Deterrent, to either move in or out of port for operational deployment and training exercises around the world. The service operates a large assortment of vessels including tugs and pilot boats as well as transporting stores, liquid and munitions and providing passenger transfer services to and from ships for officers and crew. Serco Denholm took over Marine Services to the Naval Service from the now disbanded Royal Maritime Auxiliary Service in 2008. In late 2009 Serco bought out Denholm's share, with the service now being known as Serco Marine Services.

Lists of vessels
See the articles below for lists of vessels operated by or in support of His Majesty's Naval Service:
 List of active Royal Navy ships - 72 (plus two non-commissioned training vessels, one experimental ship and several dozen smaller boats)
 List of active Royal Marines military watercraft - 33 (plus two patrol boats)
 List of active Royal Fleet Auxiliary ships - 13 (plus five ships under charter to the MoD)
 List of ships of Serco Marine Services - 63

See also 

 List of all naval vessels current and former of the United Kingdom
British Armed Forces
 Royal Navy
 Royal Marines
 Royal Fleet Auxiliary
 His Majesty's Coastguard
 Border Force
 Special Boat Service (SBS)

Notes

References

Citations

Sources 

 BR 2 - Queen's Regulations for the Royal Navy
 BR1806 - British Maritime Doctrine, Glossary
 United Kingdom Defence Statistics 2005 - glossary

 

Ministry of Defence (United Kingdom)